Giovanni Delise (1 November 1907 – 19 May 1947) was an Italian rower who competed in the 1928 Summer Olympics. In 1928 he won the gold medal as member of the Italian boat in the coxed four event.

References

External links
 profile

1907 births
1947 deaths
Italian male rowers
Olympic rowers of Italy
Rowers at the 1928 Summer Olympics
Olympic gold medalists for Italy
Olympic medalists in rowing
Medalists at the 1928 Summer Olympics
European Rowing Championships medalists